Mohammad Khater (born 25 August 1989) is a Jordanian professional footballer who plays as a goalkeeper for Jordanian club Sahab.

Career statistics

International

References

External links 
 
 

Jordanian footballers
Association football goalkeepers
Sportspeople from Amman
Al-Ahli SC (Amman) players
1989 births
Living people
Al-Salt SC players
Jordanian Pro League players
Mansheyat Bani Hasan players
Al-Asalah players
Sahab SC players
Jordan international footballers